People with the surname Verger:

 Charles Paumier du Verger (fl. 1900–1908), Belgian sports shooter
 François Verger (1911–2001), French field hockey player
 Frédéric Verger (born 1959), French writer
 Georges Verger (fl. 1896–1924), French long-distance runner who competed in the 1924 Olympics
 Giovanni Battista Verger (1796 – after 1844), Italian operatic tenor and impresario
 Joanne Verger (21st century), American politician
 Jean-Louis Verger (1826–1857), French priest, assassin of Archbishop Marie-Dominique-Auguste Sibour
 Maria Verger (1892–1983), Spanish archivist, librarian, and poet
 Pierre Edouard Leopold Verger (1902–1996), French photographer
 Virginie Morel du Verger (Christiane) (1779–1870), French pianist, music teacher, and composer.

Fictional characters 
 Mason Verger, main antagonist of the novel Hannibal

See also 

 Esther Vergeer (born 1981), Dutch wheelchair tennis player

Occupational surnames